A list of films produced in Italy in 1946 (see 1946 in film):

References

External links
Italian films of 1946 at the Internet Movie Database

Italian
1946
Films